Didymocantha obliqua is a species of longhorn beetle native to Australia. It is an established exotic in New Zealand.

References

External links
 NatureWatch NZ

Cerambycinae
Beetles described in 1840
Taxa named by Edward Newman